The 2015–16 Football League Two (referred to as the Sky Bet League Two for sponsorship reasons) was the 12th season of the Football League Two under its current title and the 24th season under its current league division format. The season began on 8 August 2015 and concluded on 7 May 2016.

Twenty-four clubs participated, eighteen of which played in League Two during the 2014–15 season. These teams were joined by Notts County, Crawley Town, Leyton Orient and Yeovil Town, who had been relegated from League One, and by Barnet and Bristol Rovers, who had been promoted from the Football Conference.

Changes from last season

Teams 
The following teams have changed division since the 2014–15 season.

To League Two
Promoted from Conference Premier
 Barnet
 Bristol Rovers

Relegated from Football League One
 Notts County
 Crawley Town
 Leyton Orient
 Yeovil Town

From League Two
Relegated to National League
 Cheltenham Town
 Tranmere Rovers

Promoted to Football League One
 Burton Albion
 Shrewsbury Town
 Bury
 Southend United

Team overview

Stadia and locations

Managerial changes

League table

Play-offs

Results

Top scorers
Source: BBC SportCorrect as of 7 May 2016

Monthly Awards

Notes

References 

 
EFL League Two seasons
3
4
Eng